This is a list of members of the 49th Legislative Assembly of Queensland from 1998 to 2001, as elected at the 1998 state election held on 13 June 1998.

 On 4 November 1998, the One Nation member for Mulgrave, Charles Rappolt, resigned. Labor candidate Warren Pitt, who had represented Mulgrave between 1989 and 1995, won the resulting by-election on 5 December 1998.
 One Nation members Shaun Nelson, Dorothy Pratt and Ken Turner left the party on 2 February 1999, and served out the remainder of their terms as independents.
 One Nation members John Kingston and Jeff Knuth left the party on 23 February 1999. Kingston served out his term as an independent. Knuth sat as an independent until 5 August 1999, when he attempted to found his own party, the Country Party QLD.
 The five remaining One Nation members, Harry Black, David Dalgleish, Bill Feldman, Jack Paff and Peter Prenzler, abandoned the party on 14 December 1999, founding their own alternative, the City Country Alliance. The five were later joined by prior colleague Knuth on 18 February 2000, once his own new party began to founder.
 On 14 December 1999, the Labor member for Bundamba, Bob Gibbs, resigned. Labor candidate Jo-Ann Miller won the resulting by-election on 5 February 2000.
 On 9 January 2000, the Labor member for Woodridge, Bill D'Arcy, resigned. Labor candidate Mike Kaiser won the resulting by-election on 5 February 2000. Kaiser left the Labor Party on 10 January 2001 as a consequence of the Shepherdson Inquiry's investigation of his role in an electoral rorting scandal. He served out his term as an independent and did not contest the 2001 election.
 The member for Capalaba, Jim Elder, was elected as a Labor member and served as Deputy Premier under Peter Beattie, but left the party on 30 November 2000 following revelations from the Shepherdson Inquiry about his alleged behaviour. He served out the final months of his term as an independent and did not contest the 2001 election.
 The member for Springwood, Grant Musgrove, was elected as a Labor member, but was forced to leave the party on 4 December 2000. He also served out the remainder of his term as an independent and did not contest the 2001 election.

See also
1998 Queensland state election
Beattie Ministry (Labor) 1998–2007

References

Members of Queensland parliaments by term
21st-century Australian politicians
20th-century Australian politicians